Jack Spence may refer to:

Jack Spence (academic) (born 1931), British academic
Jack Spence (politician) (1905–1981), Canadian politician
British rock musician in We Are the Ocean